Benton Township, Kansas may refer to:

 Benton Township, Atchison County, Kansas
 Benton Township, Butler County, Kansas
 Benton Township, Hodgeman County, Kansas

See also 
 List of Kansas townships
 Benton Township (disambiguation)

Kansas township disambiguation pages